The Hoover Moratorium was a public statement issued by United States President Herbert Hoover on June 20, 1931, who hoped to ease the ongoing international financial crisis and provide time for recovery by instituting a one-year moratorium on payments of  German and inter-Allied war debt stemming from World War I. The proposal would postpone the repayment of both capital and interest.  Many, both in the United States and abroad, were outraged by this idea.

The statement was met with initial disapproval from France and many American citizens, but, after much telephonic lobbying by Hoover, went on to gain support from 15 nations by July 6. It was approved by the United States Congress in December.  

However, neither the moratorium nor the permanent cancellation of the reparations did much to slow the economic downturn in Europe. Germany was caught in a major banking crisis, Britain left the gold standard – the US would follow suit in 1933 as part of President Franklin Roosevelt's New Deal – and France intended to address the issue again once the one-year suspension had ended. 

A few of the former Allies continued to make payments to the United States after the moratorium expired. However, only Finland was able and willing to meet all obligations.  A committee formed under the terms of Young Plan – a previous reduction in Germany's war debt schedule – concluded that Germany would not be able to meet its obligations, and recommended that their debt be permanently cancelled. At the Lausanne Conference of 1932, the United Kingdom and France relieved Germany of its reparation payments, subject to their being able to reach an agreement with the United States concerning their own outstanding war debts. Although the United States Congress voted against the proposition to relieve France and the United Kingdom of their debt, they never started paying their debt again as the German payment had been used for it before, and conditions soon militated against their being able to do so.

See also
Dawes Plan
Young Plan
Lausanne Conference of 1932

References

Further reading
 Banholzer, Simon, and Tobias Straumann. "Why the French Said ‘Non’: A New Perspective on the Hoover Moratorium of June 1931." Journal of Contemporary History 56.4 (2021): 1040-1060.
 Matera, Paulina. "The Question of War Debts and Reparations in French-American Relations after WWI." Humanities and Social Sciences 21.23 (2) (2016): 133-143. online
 Pemberton, Jo-Anne. "The Hoover Plan, Reparations and the French Constructive Plan." in Pemberton, The Story of International Relations, Part Two (Palgrave Macmillan, Cham, 2019) pp. 185-277.

 Reinhart, Carmen M., and Christoph Trebesch. "Sovereign debt relief and its aftermath." Journal of the European Economic Association 14.1 (2016): 215-251. online

Great Depression in the United States
History of the foreign relations of the United States
Aftermath of World War I in Germany
Moratorium
1930s economic history
1931 in international relations
1931 in the United States
Aftermath of World War I in the United States
1931 documents